Qezel Qayeh-ye Vosta (also Romanized as Qezel Qayeh-ye Vosţá) is a village in Hulasu Rural District, in the Central District of Shahin Dezh County, West Azerbaijan Province, Iran. As of the 2006 census, its population was 203, with there being 36 families.

References 

Populated places in Shahin Dezh County